Staphylaea is a genus of sea snails, marine gastropod mollusks in the family Cypraeidae, the cowries.

Species
Species within the genus Staphylaea include:

 Staphylaea limacina (Lamarck, 1810)
 Staphylaea semiplota (Mighels, 1845)
 Staphylaea staphylaea (Linnaeus, 1758)

Synonyms
 Staphylaea nucleus (Linnaeus, 1758) is a synonym of Nucleolaria nucleus (Linnaeus, 1758)

References

External links

Cypraeidae